Lotus Challenge is a racing video game released in 2001 by Kuju Entertainment.

Development
The game was announced in August 2000.

Reception

GameSpy gave the Xbox version of the game a score of 3 out of 5 stating"Lotus Challenge is very deep and is worth every penny of its price if you take the time to get to know it"

Sales
The game sold more than 130,000 units for the PlayStation 2.

References

2001 video games
GameCube games
Lotus Cars
PlayStation 2 games
Racing video games
Virgin Interactive games
Windows games
Xbox games